Sitting volleyball at the 2017 ASEAN Para Games was held at Malaysian International Trade & Exhibition Centre (MITEC), Kuala Lumpur.

Medal summary

Medalists

See also
Volleyball at the 2017 Southeast Asian Games

External links
 Sitting volleyball games results system

2017 ASEAN Para Games
Sitting volleyball at the ASEAN Para Games